Jiang Yu (born 20 September 1998) is a Chinese footballer currently playing as a midfielder for Zibo Cuju.

Career statistics

Club
.

References

1998 births
Living people
Chinese footballers
Association football midfielders
China League One players
Beijing Renhe F.C. players
Heilongjiang Ice City F.C. players
Chongqing Liangjiang Athletic F.C. players
Zibo Cuju F.C. players